James Edward "Long Jim" Still Jr. (March 5, 1924 – January 3, 1999) was an American football player who played quarterback and punter. He played college football for Mississippi Gulf Coast College and Georgia Tech and professional football for the Buffalo Bills.

Early years
Still was born in 1924 in Columbia, South Carolina. He attended and played football at Panama City High School in Panama City, Florida.

College football and military service
He played college football at Mississippi Gulf Coast College and Georgia Tech. He also served in the United States Marine Corps. During World War II he took part in many invasions in the Philippine theater. He led the 1947 Georgia Tech Yellow Jackets football team to a 10–1 record, a No. 10 national ranking, and a victory while throwing 3 touchdown passes in the 1948 Orange Bowl.

Professional football
Still was selected by the Chicago Cardinals in the 16th round (145th overall pick) of the 1948 NFL Draft but did not play for the Cardinals. He instead signed in January 1948 with the Los Angeles Dons of the All-America Football Conference (AAFC). In August 1948, the Dons traded Still to the Buffalo Bills. He played for the Bills during the 1948 and 1949 seasons, appearing in 21 AAFC games.

Family and later years
He died in 1999 at age 74 in Green Cove Springs, Florida.

References

1924 births
1999 deaths
Buffalo Bills (AAFC) players
Georgia Tech Yellow Jackets football players
Players of American football from Columbia, South Carolina
United States Marine Corps personnel of World War II